Sir Robert Francis Dunnell, 1st Baronet, KCB (26 July 1868 – 16 July 1960) was an English solicitor, civil servant and railway executive.

Dunnell was born in Bury St Edmunds, Suffolk and educated at Rossall School. He was admitted a solicitor in 1891 and joined the Solicitor's Department of the North Eastern Railway Company. He became assistant solicitor to the company in 1900, solicitor in 1905, and also secretary to the company in 1906.

In 1917 he was appointed Assistant Secretary to the Admiralty and the following year served as secretary to the British Naval Mission to the United States under Sir Eric Geddes. At the end of the First World War he became secretary of the demobilisation section of the War Cabinet and in 1919 first secretary and solicitor to the new Ministry of Transport. In 1919 he was appointed Knight Commander of the Order of the Bath (KCB).

In 1921 he returned to his old company, which amalgamated into the London and North Eastern Railway Company in 1923, as chief legal adviser. In December 1921 it was announced that he would be created a baronet for his services to the Ministry of Transport, with the creation being 11 January 1922. He retired in 1928, but in April 1930 was appointed a Railway and Canal Commissioner.

In 1947 he moved to Nairobi, Kenya, where he died. His wife Ruby (née Garrett) had died in 1901, after only four years of childless marriage, and the baronetcy thus became extinct upon his death.

Footnotes

References
Obituary, The Times, 18 July 1960

1868 births
1960 deaths
People from Bury St Edmunds
People educated at Rossall School
English solicitors
London and North Eastern Railway people
Permanent Secretaries of the Ministry of Transport
Civil servants in the Admiralty
Civil servants in the Cabinet Office
Baronets in the Baronetage of the United Kingdom
Knights Commander of the Order of the Bath